Wouter Claes (born 28 October 1975) is a left-handed Belgian badminton player. He won 20 Belgian titles, 10 in the men's doubles with Frédéric Mawet and Ruud Kuijten, 10 in the mixed doubles with Manon Albinus, Corina Herrle and Nathalie Descamps. He won 20 Flemish Championships in singles, men's doubles with Nico Claes and Steven Delsaert and mixed doubles with Nathalie Descamps and Janne Elst. He won a bronze medal in the mixed doubles (together with partner Descamps) during the 2010 European Badminton Championships. This was the first Belgian medal ever won at a European Championship. During his career, he was placed 21 in world ranking.

Achievements

European Championships 
Mixed doubles

BWF International Challenge/Series 
Men's doubles

Mixed doubles

  BWF International Challenge tournament
  BWF International Series/European Circuit tournament

References

External links 
 

1975 births
Living people
Sportspeople from Leuven
Belgian male badminton players